Stephen George Frederick Hall (born 25 December 1953) is a British economist and academic. He is currently a professor and head of the economics department  at the University of Leicester, where he is a deputy pro vice chancellor.

Early life and education

Hall was born in London in 1953. He received his bachelor's degree from City University London in 1977, followed by a master's degree (1978) and doctorate (1986) from the London School of Economics. His thesis was Solving and Evaluating Large Non-Linear Econometric Models. He holds a doctorate of commerce honoris causa from the University of Pretoria, South Africa, where he is a visiting professor.

Career 

Formerly
Senior research fellow at the national institute of economic and social research
Economic advisor at the Bank of England
Professorial research fellow at the London business school

Currently professor at Leicester University

Past consultancies include
The United Nations Desai
The European central banks
The International Monetary Fund 
Y
The European Commission
Numerous central banks

Select publications
Hall is a co-editor of the journal Economic Modelling, the Central European Journal of Economic Modelling and Econometrics and Applied Financial Economics.

References

External links
 Stephen G. Hall: Publications

1953 births
Living people
People from Bethnal Green
Alumni of City, University of London
Alumni of the London School of Economics
Academics of the University of Leicester
Vice-Chancellors of the University of Leicester
Academic staff of the University of Pretoria
British economists